Basketo may refer to:
the Basketo people
the Basketo language
Basketo special woreda